Urocystis occulta is a smut fungus which attacks the leaves and stalks of rye (Secale cereale). It is found in Australia, Europe, and North America. The fungus was first described by German botanist Karl Friedrich Wilhelm Wallroth under the name Erysiphe occulta in 1833.

References 

Fungi described in 1833
Fungi of Australia
Fungi of Europe
Fungi of North America
Fungal plant pathogens and diseases
Rye diseases
Pleosporaceae
Taxa named by Karl Friedrich Wilhelm Wallroth